Luis Hernán Pérez Ramírez (born 30 July 1959) is a Chilean former footballer.

References

1959 births
Living people
Association football midfielders
Chilean footballers
Olympic footballers of Chile
Footballers at the 1984 Summer Olympics